Nippur (Sumerian: Nibru, often logographically recorded as , EN.LÍLKI, "Enlil City;" Akkadian: Nibbur) was an ancient Sumerian city. It was the special seat of the worship of the Sumerian god Enlil, the "Lord Wind", ruler of the cosmos, subject to An alone. Nippur was located in modern Nuffar in Afak, Al-Qādisiyyah Governorate, Iraq. It is roughly 200 kilometers south of modern Baghdad and about 60 miles southeast of the ancient city of Babylon. Occupation at the site extended back to the Ubaid period (Ubaid 2 - Hajji Muhammed), the Uruk period, and the Jemdet Nasr period.

History 
Nippur never enjoyed political hegemony in its own right, but its control was crucial, as it was considered capable of conferring the overall "kingship" on monarchs from other city-states. It was distinctively a sacred city, important from the possession of the famous Ekur temple of Enlil. Ninurta also had his main cult center, the E-shumesha temple, in the city-state.

According to the Tummal Chronicle, Enmebaragesi, an early ruler of Kish, was the first to build up
this temple.
His influence over Nippur has also been detected archaeologically. The Chronicle lists successive early Sumerian rulers who kept up intermittent ceremonies at the temple: Aga of Kish, son of Enmebaragesi; Mesannepada of Ur; his son Meskiang-nunna; Gilgamesh of Uruk; his son Ur-Nungal; Nanni of Ur and his son Meskiang-nanna. It also indicates that the practice was revived in the Ur III period by Ur-Nammu of Ur, and continued until Ibbi-Sin appointed Enmegalana high priest in Uruk (c. 1950 BC).

Inscriptions of Lugal-Zage-Si and Lugal-kigub-nidudu, kings of Uruk and Ur respectively, and of other early rulers, on door-sockets and stone vases, show the veneration in which the ancient shrine was then held, and the importance attached to its possession, as giving a certain stamp of legitimacy. On their votive offerings, some of these rulers designate themselves as ensis, or governors.

Akkadian, Ur III, and Old Babylonian periods

Late in the 3rd millennium BC, Nippur was conquered and occupied by the rulers of Akkad, or Agade, and numerous votive objects of Sargon, Rimush, and Naram-Sin testify to the veneration in which they also held this sanctuary. Naram-Sin rebuilt both the Ekur temple and the city walls, and in the accumulation of debris now marking the ancient site, his remains are found about halfway from the top to the bottom. One of the few instances of Nippur being recorded as having its own ruler comes from a tablet depicting a revolt of several Mesopotamian cities against Naram-Sin, including Nippur under Amar-enlila. The tablet goes on to relate that Naram-Sin defeated these rebel cities in nine battles, and brought them back under his control. The Weidner tablet (ABC 19) suggests that the Akkadian Empire fell as divine retribution, because of Sargon's initiating the transfer of "holy city" status from Nippur to Babylon.

This Akkadian occupation was succeeded by occupation during the third dynasty of Ur, and the constructions of Ur-Nammu, the great builder of temples, are superimposed immediately upon those of Naram-Sin. Ur-Nammu gave the temple its final characteristic form. Partly razing the constructions of his predecessors, he erected a terrace of bricks, some 12 m high, covering a space of about 32,000 m. Near the northwestern edge, towards the western corner, he built a ziggurat of three stages of dry brick, faced with kiln-fired bricks laid in bitumen. On the summit stood, as at Ur and Eridu, a small chamber, the special shrine or abode of the god. Access to the stages of the ziggurat, from the court beneath, was by an inclined plane on the south-east side. To the north-east of the ziggurat stood, apparently, the House of Bel, and in the courts below the ziggurat stood various other buildings, shrines, treasure chambers, and the like. The whole structure was oriented with the corners toward the cardinal points of the compass.

Ur-Nammu also rebuilt the walls of the city on the line of Naram-Sin's walls. The restoration of the general features of the temple of this, and the immediately succeeding periods, has been greatly facilitated by the discovery of a sketch map on a fragment of a clay tablet. This sketch map represents a quarter of the city to the east of the Shatt-en-Nil canal. This quarter was enclosed within its own walls, a city within a city, forming an irregular square, with sides roughly 820 m long, separated from the other quarters, and from the country to the north and east, by canals on all sides, with broad quays along the walls. A smaller canal divided this quarter of the city itself into two parts. In the south-eastern part, in the middle of its southeast side, stood the temple, while in the northwest part, along the Shatt-en-Nil, two great storehouses are indicated.

The temple continued to be built upon or rebuilt by kings of various succeeding dynasties, as shown by bricks and votive objects bearing the inscriptions of the kings of various dynasties of Ur and Isin. It seems to have suffered severely in some manner at or about the time the Elamites invaded, as shown by broken fragments of statuary, votive vases, and the like, from that period. At the same time it seems to have won recognition from the Elamite conquerors, so that Rim-Sin I, the Elamite king of Larsa, styles himself "shepherd of the land of Nippur". With the establishment of the Babylonian empire, under Hammurabi, early in the 2nd millennium BC, the religious, as well as the political center of influence, was transferred to Babylon, Marduk became lord of the pantheon, many of Enlil's attributes were transferred to him, and Ekur, Enlil's temple, was to some extent neglected.

Kassite through Sassanid periods
Under the succeeding Kassite dynasty, shortly after the middle of the 2nd millennium, Ekur was restored once more to its former splendor, several monarchs of that dynasty built upon and adorned it, and thousands of inscriptions, dating from the time of those rulers, have been discovered in its archives. A new temple within Ekur, the Ekurigibarra, was built by Kurigalzu I (c. 1375 BC). After the middle of the 12th century BC follows another long period of comparative neglect due to the river Euphrates changing its course, but with the waters return and the conquest of Babylonia by the Assyrian king Sargon II, at the close of the 8th century BC, we meet again with building inscriptions, and under Ashurbanipal, about the middle of the 7th century BC, we find Ekur restored with a splendour greater than ever before, the ziggurat of that period being 58 by 39 m. After the fall of the Neo-Assyrian Empire Ekur appears to have gradually fallen into decay, until finally, in the Seleucid period, the ancient temple was turned into a fortress (Nippoúr). Huge walls were erected at the edges of the ancient terrace, the courts of the temple were filled with houses and streets, and the ziggurat itself was curiously built over in a cruciform shape, and converted into an acropolis for the fortress. This fortress was occupied and further built upon until the close of the Parthian period, about 250 AD; but under the succeeding rule of the Sassanids it in its turn fell into decay, and the ancient sanctuary became, to a considerable extent, a mere place of sepulture, only a small village of mud huts huddled about the ancient ziggurat continuing to be inhabited.

Islamic abandonment
Nippur remained inhabited in Islamic times, and is mentioned by early Muslim geographers under the name of Niffar. It lay on the Nahr an-Nars canal, believed to have been built by Narses. By the late 800s, though, geographers no longer mentioned it, which indicates that the city had gone into decline by that time. This was part of a broader decline in settlements throughout Iraq, especially in the south, as decaying infrastructure and political violence resulted in large areas being completely abandoned. However, Nippur remained the seat of an Assyrian Church of the East Christian bishopric until the late 900s, when the bishopric was transferred to the city of Nil, further northwest. Nippur itself may have remained occupied even later, since ceramics found among the ruins display underglaze sgraffiato drawings, which were not used much prior to the end of the 10th century. By the time of Yaqut al-Hamawi in the early 1200s, Nippur had been definitively abandoned, although Yaqut still recognized its ruins as the site of a famous place.

Archaeology 

Nippur was situated on both sides of the Shatt-en-Nil canal, one of the earliest courses of the Euphrates, between the present bed of that river and the Tigris, almost 160 km southeast of Baghdad. It is represented by the great complex of ruin mounds known to the Arabs as Nuffar, written by the earlier explorers Niffer, divided into two main parts by the dry bed of the old Shatt-en-Nil (Arakhat). The highest point of these ruins, a conical hill rising about 30 m above the level of the surrounding plain, northeast of the canal bed, is called by the Arabs Bint el-Amiror "prince's daughter".

Nippur was first excavated, briefly, by Sir Austen Henry Layard in 1851. Full-scale digging was begun by an expedition from the University of Pennsylvania. The work involved four seasons of excavation between 1889 and 1900 and was led by John Punnett Peters, John Henry Haynes, and Hermann Volrath Hilprecht. Thousands of tablets were found at a smaller mound dubbed "tablet hill", about 7.5 meters in average height and 52 square meters in area, southeast of the temple mound. A true arch, one of the worlds earliest examples, was also found. In the Parthian layer a box containing fragments of votive axes made of glass from the Kassite period were found. Several late Kassite rulers are represented including Kurigalzu II.

Nippur was excavated for 19 seasons between 1948 and 1990 by a team from the Oriental Institute of Chicago, joined at times by the University of Pennsylvania Museum of Archaeology and Anthropology and the American Schools of Oriental Research. A temple of Inanna, begun in the Early Dynastic period was completely excavated. Subsequent superimposed new iterations of the temple extended all the way up to Parthian times.  Finds included a tablet dated to the 4th year of the Kassite king Shagarakti-Shuriash, one dated to the 44th year of Ur III king Shulgi, and an Indus Valley stamp seal. In 1977 they briefly excavated at the nearby site of Umm al-Hafriyat which was in the process of being heavily looted.

Preliminary efforts to restart work at Nippur began in 2018 under McGuire Gibson. Excavation work at Nippur began in April 2019 under Abbas Alizadeh. Initial focus at Nippur was on a major Parthian period building and a small Late Sassnian house. Permission has also been granted to dig at Dlehim and Drehem. Excavation began in November 2022 for the 21st season which lasted two months. Work began at nearby Drehem but ceased after authorities decided that a police station must first be established there to prevent looting. Work then returned to the Parthian building.

Ziggurat 
Extensive excavation details have been recorded for the Ziggurat of Ur-Gur. Overall, the ziggurat site is 25 metres in height, has a rectangular base of 39 metres by 58 metres, consisting three stages of dry brick, and faced with kiln-fired bricks laid in bitumen. The northern corner of the ziggurat points to 12 degrees east of the magnetic north. Construction structure and materials are homogeneous, of small unbaked bricks, laid in different ways: first layer of bricks is on the edge sides with the flat sides out, second layer on the edge sides with the ends out, third layer on the flat sides with the edges out.

The ziggurat contains a water conduit system. From the upper surface of the ziggurat, there is a conduit for water drainage in the middle of three façades. Built by baked bricks 1 metre in breadth and 3 metres in depth, around the conduit base is a plaster of bitumen, sloping outward with gutters to carry off water.

Pavements extend from the ziggurat in a cruciform shape with square-like large bricks, in which pieces of pottery are used to fasten the clay together. They extend 2.4 metres below the ziggurat foundation and 12 metres away, connected to the lowest stage of the ziggurat, which protects the ziggurat foundation from rain.

Temple of Enlil 
The Temple of Enlil situated northeast of the ziggurat was excavated. Topography of the Temple of Enlil was yielded. By stratigraphic excavation, the chronological sequence of the temple could be constructed. The temple dated to Ur III period was constructed by Urnammu, restored and rebuilt by kings ruled Nippur for centuries.

As the Temple of Enlil was rebuilt after Ur III, the architectural information provided was based on remains from the Ur III period. The rectangular temple measured about 45×21 m with one entrance on the northeast wall and one entrance on the southwest wall. Floors were paved with baked-brick square bricks with size of 37 cm. 2 substructures built beneath the paved floor with 1.3 m elevation. Walls that the thickness varied from 3.35 to 3.95 m were constructed with straw-tempered unbaked bricks and mud mortar. There was no indication for windows walls above floor level were not preserved but windows were required for additional lighting in the Temple of Enlil. The possible height of the walls was 13.2 m as it was three times of the substructure which is 4.40 m. Although no remains of the roof left, purlins and reeds were covered first and then rammed earth mixed with straw was layered.

From the floor plan of the Temple of Enlil in Ur III period, 2 cellae each connected with 2 minor chambers with wider doorways (2.40 m, 1.45 m for normal doorway) and 2 subsidiary chambers were presented. The burning evidence in the cella (room 13) and the minor chambers (room 16,17) adjacent to the other cella (room 18), the inscription of the Temple of Enlil around Ur III period; both indicated the purpose of the Temple of Enlil was to feed gods on the adjacent ziggurat, as ‘kitchen temple’, so food preparation could be taken place. Other than that, the Temple of Enlil shown no place of a dais for enthroned deities. Thus, the Temple of Enlil was not for worshiping. Yet, religious ritual related to divine repast perhaps libation, could serve as the purpose of Temple of Enlil during Ur III period.

Temple of Gula
In 1990 Oriental Institute excavators identified a building in area WA as the Temple of Gula, a goddess of healing and consort of Ninurta. The earliest identified construction of the temple was in the Isin-Larsa period, with major rebuilds in the Kassite, Neo-Assyrian, and Neo-Babylonian periods. It is thought that the missing temple of Ninurta is nearby.

Murashu archive
Almost directly opposite the temple, a large palace was excavated, apparently of the Seleucid period, and in this neighborhood and further southward on these mounds large numbers of inscribed tablets of various periods, including temple archives of the Kassite and commercial archives of the Persian period, were excavated. The latter, the "books and papers" of the house of Murashu, commercial agents of the government, throw light on the condition of the city and the administration of the country in the Persian period, the 5th century BCE. The former gives us a very good idea of the administration of an ancient temple. The whole city of Nippur appears to have been at that time merely an appendage of the temple. The temple itself was a great landowner, possessed of both farms and pasture land. Its tenants were obliged to render careful accounts of their administration of the property entrusted to their care, which was preserved in the archives of the temple. We have also from these archives lists of goods contained in the temple treasuries and salary lists of temple officials, on tablet forms specially prepared and marked off for periods of a year or less.

The Persian conquest of Mesopotamia in 539 BC resulted in improved irrigation, and thus immigration increased, drawing Lydians, Phrygians, Carians, Cilicians, Egyptians, Jews (many of whom were deported to Babylonia), Persians, Medes, Sacae, etc. to the area. In Nippur, the house of Murashu's surviving documents are reflective of this diverse populace as one-third of contracts depict non-Babylonian names, and they evidently intermingled peaceably. Enduring for at least three successive generations, the house of Murashu capitalized on the enterprise of renting substantial plots of farmland having been awarded to occupying Persian governors, nobility, soldiery, probably at discounted rates, whose owners were most likely satisfied with a moderate return. The business would then subdivide these into smaller plots for cultivation by indigenous farmers and recent foreign settlers for a lucrative fee. The house of Murashu leased land, subdivided it, then subleased or rented out the smaller parcels, thereby simply acting as an intermediary. It thereby profited both from the collected rents and percentage of amassed credit reflective of that year's future crop harvests after supplying needed farming implements, means of irrigation, and paying taxes. In 423/422 BC, the house of Murashu took in "about 20,000 kg or 20,000 shekels of silver". "The activities of the house of Murashu had a ruinous effect upon the economy of the country and thus led to the bankruptcy of the landowners. Although the house of Murashu loaned money to the landowners initially, after a few decades it began more and more to take the landowners' place, and the land began to concentrate in its hands."

On the upper surface of these mounds was found a considerable Jewish town, dating from about the beginning of the Arabic period onward to the 10th century AD, in the houses of which were large numbers of Aramaic incantation bowls. Jewish names, appearing in the Persian documents discovered at Nippur, show, however, that Jewish settlement at that city dates in fact from a much earlier period.

Site TA 

Site TA is a 20 m × 40 m area located in Tablet Hill in Nippur. It is built in between 1948–1952 and was partially abandoned due to economic crisis in 1739 B.C. and fully vacated in 1720 B.C. It served as a small community with residential buildings and some minor public infrastructures at that time. TA is full of small size, irregular buildings which create a community as a whole. Houses found in TA is generally one-storey which is a common feature at that period of time. Only three of the houses have a stair to the upper level but it is not considered a two-storey but rooftop level.

There are total of 1.591 tablets found in site TA. Regarding the texts type found in tablets are divided into two main categories, private documents and educational material, TA is viewed as a residential area. Most of the houses in TA are residential housing while only one of the houses (House F) are viewed as scribal school, this conclusion is made due to the significant amount of 1,407 tablets are found in House F. Moreover, organic materials were found in some of the houses, therefore, there might be animal husbandry. Moreover, due to the contents of tablets, it is believed that TA is owned by small private owner.

Inanna Temple 
Inanna temple is a historical hallmark of Mesopotamia. Though the temple was a religious element in the dynasty of Ur, there were a lot of political and social issues associated with the temple. The excavations that led to the discovery of the remains of the temple of Nippur were conducted by Donald McCown in 1951. During the excavation, the team inadvertently experienced difficulty progressing with their work. The excavators reached a surface that appeared like a baked brick pavement. Notably, this incident drew a lot of interest in the team, and with further progress, they reached what seemed to be a room. Further into their excavation, they discovered a room with inscriptions, suggesting that the building was a temple built by Sulgi, the second king of the third dynasty of Ur. However, the architectural plan of the temple is further demonstrated by the layers of the building.   During the excavation, it was noted that the building had twenty-three-level layers. The excavators revealed that each of the twenty-three layers serves a different purpose. For instance, levels VIII-VII were associated with sculptures and idols used in the temple's religious activities. On the temple's exterior, the excavators found that it was characterised by niches that supported the religious activities at the temple. The niches had special tablets inscipted with literature regarding the teachings at the temple. The Inanna temple had significant political influence in the Ur dynasty. It was built, supported by Sulgi and many subsequent kings, using it as a pedestal to manage the leadership of the dynasty. The temple had specific administrative units that were answerable to the reigning king of the dynasty. This could be attributed to the fact that the leading goddess of the temple, Inanna, was associated with power. Kings believed that the Inanna goddess has the power to influence political issues, which explained the temple's importance and long-lasting popularity throughout the dynasties.

Drehem
Drehem or ancient Puzrish-Dagan, sometimes called a suburb of Nippur, is the best-known city of the so-called redistribution centers of the Ur III period. It is located some 10 kilometers south of Nippur. Witnessed by thousands of cuneiform tablets, livestock (cattle, sheep, and goats) of the state was centralized at Drehem and redistributed to the temples, its officials and the royal palaces of Sumer. The temples of nearby Nippur were the main destinations of the livestock. The city was founded by Shulgi, king of Ur. Some of its cuneiform archives are at the Royal Ontario Museum, Toronto.

Tell Waresh 2
The site of Tell Waresh 2 lies 12 kilometers northeast of Nippur (UTM 38 S 532261.73 m E, 3561401.12 m N) and was subject to a rescue excavation in 1990 led by Muhammad Yahya Radhi on behalf of the Iraqi State Board of Antiquities and Heritage. It was one of a number of rescue excavation in response to the digging of the Main Drain Canal project. The site showed outlines of buildings and many artifacts on the surface. Remains were of the Isin-Larsa period and included clay sealings, cylinder seals, and a number of cuneiform tablets, mainly legal documents. The most prominent of the latter were 29 tablets found in a clay jar which contained year names of four rulers of Larsa, Abi-Sare, Sumu-el, Nur-Adad, and Sin-Iddinam (1785 BC to 1778 BC). The same team revisted the site in 2019 as part of larger survey in the area, obtaining georeferenced data.  A final report is now in progress.

Notable people
Lu-diĝira, nobleman and poet

See also
Sumerian Farmer's Almanac
Cities of the ancient Near East
Short chronology timeline
Garden of the gods (Sumerian paradise)
Bowl of Utu

Notes

References

McGuire Gibson, Richard L. Zettler, and James A. Armstrong, "The Southern Corner of Nippur: Summary of Excavations During the 14th and 15th Seasons," Sumer, vol. 39, pp. 170–190, 1983
Marcel Sigrist, Drehem, CDL Press, 1993, 
McGuire Gibson (Oriental Institute, U. of Chicago) 'Patterns of occupation at Nippur,' 1992
Donald E. McCown, Excavations at Nippur, 1948–50, Journal of Near Eastern Studies, vol. 11, no. 3, pp. 169–176, 1952
V.E. Crawford, Nippur the Holy City, Archaeology, vol. 12, pp. 74–83, 1959
D.P. Hanson and G.f. Dales, The Temple of Inanna Queen of Heaven at Nippur, Archaeology, vol. 15, pp. 75–84, 1962
Edward Chiera, Cuneiform Series, Volume I: Sumerian Lexical Texts from the Temple School of Nippur, Oriental Institute Publication 11, 1929
E. C. Stone, Nippur Neighborhoods, Oriental Institute, Studies in Ancient Oriental Civilization, vol. 44, 1987, 
A. L. Oppenheim, Siege Documents from Nippur, Iraq, vol. 17, no. 1, pp. 69–89, 1955
T. Fish, The Summerian City Nippur in the Period of the Third Dynasty of Ur, Iraq, vol. 5, pp. 157–179, 1938
McGuire Gibson, A Re-Evaluation of the Akkad Period in the Diyala Region on the Basis of Recent Excavations at Nippur and in the Hamrin, American Journal of Archaeology, vol. 86, no. 4, pp. 531–538, 1982
Neumann, Hans, "Nippur–‘Heiliger Ort’ der Sumerer", in: Reinhard Achenbach / Nikola Moustakis (eds.), Heilige Orte der Antike – Gesammelte Studien im Anschluss an eine Ringvorlesung des Exzellenzclusters “Religion und Politik in den Kulturen der Vormoderne und der Moderne” an der Universität Münster im Wintersemester 2013/2014(Kasion 1), Münster, pp. 37–66, 2018
 Elizabeth C. Stone and Paul E. Zimansky, Old Babylonian Contracts From Nippur: Selected Texts From the University Museum University of Pennsylvania, Oriental Institute of the University of Chicago Microfiche Archives, Volume 1 Chicago: University of Chicago Press, 1976
Zettler, Richard L., The Ur III Temple of Inanna at Nippur: The Operation and Organization of Urban Religious Institutions in Mesopotamia in the Late Third Millennium B.C. Berliner Beitraege zum vorderen Orient 11. Berlin: Dietrich Reimer, 1992
Adams, Robert M. (1981). Heartland of Cities. Chicago: University of Chicago Press. .
Tim Clayden - Bernhard Schneider: Assurbanipal and the Ziggurat at Nippur. KASKAL 12, 2015, 348-382.
 Hugo Radau, "Letters to Cassite kings from the Temple archives of Nippur", The Babylonian expedition of the University of Pennsylvania. Series A: Cuneiform texts., vol. 17, pt. 1, 1908
 Fisher, C. S., "Mycenaean Palace at Nippur", American Joumal of Archaeology, vol. 8, pp. 403–32, 1904
Sallaberger, W. (2019). The Cupbearer and the Cult-Priest in the Temple: External and Internal Cultic Practitioners in Early Bronze Age Mesopotamia. Journal of ancient near eastern religions, 19(1-2), 90-111.
Michalowski, P. (2021). The correspondence of the kings of Ur. In The Correspondence of the Kings of Ur. Penn State University Press.
Verderame, L. (2018). Slavery in third-millennium Mesopotamia: an overview of sources and studies. Journal of global slavery, 3(1-2), 13-40.
Barnard, B. E. (2020). Domesticated Partners: A New Analysis of a Sumerian Vessel. Metropolitan Museum Journal, 55(1), 91-99.
Garfinkle, S. J. (2022). The Kingdom of Ur. The Oxford History of the Ancient Near East: Volume II: Volume II: From the End of the Third Millennium BC to the Fall of Babylon, 121.

External links

Nippur Digitized - Record of 1889-1900 excavation
The story the bowls tell - Penn Today - Michele W. Berger - September 6, 2022
Nippur - Museum Bulletin of the Penn Museum, Volume X / Number 3-4 1944
The Nippur Expedition: the holy city of Nippur - Oriental Institute of Chicago
Nippur Archaeological Site Photographs at Oriental Institute
Drehem cuneiform tablets at Milliken University
85/452 Tablet, cuneiform receipt for livestock, terracotta, Drehem, 2041 BCE

Al-Qādisiyyah Governorate
Archaeological sites in Iraq
Sumerian cities
Holy cities
Former populated places in Iraq
Former kingdoms